Orur (sometimes spelled Oriyur or Oreiour) is a small village located in Tiruvadanai taluk, Ramanathapuram district, Tamil Nadu, India. It is situated 35 km from Devakottai, Sivagangai. As of the 2011 Census of India, the village had a population of 5,065 across 1,171 households. There were 2,470 males and 2,595 females.

The Christian saint John de Britto, a Portuguese Jesuit known as Arulanandar in Tamil, was martyred at Orur in 1693. There is a shrine to Britto in the village, where he is a significant figure revered by the Kallar, Maravar and Agamudayar castes.

References

Villages in Ramanathapuram district